Aksenovka is a rural locality (a village) in Andreyevskoye Rural Settlement, Alexandrovsky District, Vladimir Oblast, Russia. The population was 61 as of 2010. There is 1 street.

Geography 
Aksenovka is located on the Maly Kirchazh River, 12 km east of Alexandrov (the district's administrative centre) by road. Vyalkovka is the nearest rural locality.

References 

Rural localities in Alexandrovsky District, Vladimir Oblast
Alexandrovsky Uyezd (Vladimir Governorate)